Indus Battle Royale is an upcoming battle royale game developed and published by SuperGaming.

Gameplay 

The island map of Indus, Virlok, has a futuristic concept based on Indian culture and lush vegetation. Players can choose between first-person and third-person perspective.

Indus is inspired by Indian culture and mythology, and features the Indus Valley Civilisation as the theme. The game is set in "Indo-Futurism, a futuristic world that is unapologetically Indian in its exploration and representation of science fiction".

Release 
On Google Play for Android, the pre-registration for Indus is open. Furthermore, registration for iOS will soon be available.

See also 

 Underworld Gang Wars
 Mumbai Gullies

References

External links 

 Official website

Battle royale games 
Android (operating system) games 
Multiplayer video games 
Third-person shooters 
Video games set on islands 
Video games set in India 
Video games developed in India